Hermotimus coriaceus is a species of jumping spiders found in West Africa. It is the sole species in the genus Hermotimus.

Name
Hermotimus of Pedasa was a eunuch guardian of the Persian king Xerxes. However, the genus name could also refer to Hermotimus of Clazomenae, an early Greek philosopher.

The species name is derived from Latin, meaning "leathery".

References

Further reading
 Simon, E. (1903): Arachnides de la Guinée espagnole. Mém. Soc. esp. hist. nat. 1(3): 65-124.
 Simon, E. (1903): Histoire naturelle des araignées. Paris, 2: 669-1080.
 Prószyński, J. (1987): Atlas rysunkow diagnostycznych mniej znanych Salticidae 2. Zeszyty Naukowe Wyzszej Szkoly Rolniczo-Pedagogicznej, Siedlcach. (in polish)

External links
 Diagnostic drawings

Salticidae
Spiders of Africa
Spiders described in 1903